Mari Black is an American multistyle violinist, fiddler, and composer from Boston, Massachusetts.  She has won national and international accolades in many styles of music, including being named the 2014 Glenfiddich Fiddle Champion of Scotland, 2013 & 2015 U.S. National Scottish Fiddle Champion, 2012 & 2014 Maritime Fiddle Champion, 2011 Canadian Open Novelty Fiddle Champion, 2011 1st Prize Winner of the American Protege International Piano and Strings Competition, and more. Mari has performed and taught around the United States, Scotland, Brazil, Canada, China, Korea, Zimbabwe, Hungary, Poland, the Czech Republic, Italy, and France.  She plays many different styles of music including Irish, Scottish, Canadian, and American fiddling, Argentine Tango, jazz, klezmer, Western Classical music, and folk.

Black received a Master of Music degree and Artist Diploma in Violin Performance from the Yale School of Music, and a Doctorate degree in Education from Columbia University’s Teachers College, where she was the Geffen Fellow in Interdisciplinary Arts and Creativity.

Notable Awards 
 2022 Dan R. MacDonald Fiddle Prize, Scottish Performing Arts Classic
 2021 Freshgrass Fiddle Awards, finalist
 2019 & 2021 U.S. Grand Master Fiddle Championships, top 10
 2017 MASC International Songwriting Competition, Gold Medal, Instrumental category
 2015 & 2013 U.S. National Scottish Fiddle Champion
 2014 & 2012 Maritime Fiddle Champion
 2014 Glenfiddich Fiddle Champion of Scotland
 2011 Canadian Open Novelty Fiddle Champion
 2011 American Protege International Strings and Piano Competition, 1st prize
 2008 Columbia University Teachers College, Geffen Fellowship in Interdisciplinary Arts and Creativity
 2007 & 2005 American String Teachers' Association Alternative Styles Award winner

Discography 
 Unscripted (2020, with Cory Pesaturo)
 Flight (2014)

References 

Living people
American violinists
21st-century violinists
Year of birth missing (living people)